MTV Live (formerly Palladia) is an 24-hour American pay television music video channel owned by Paramount Global. The channel, which broadcasts exclusively in 1080i high definition, broadcasts music videos and music-related programming from Paramount owned networks MTV, MTV Classic, VH1 and CMT, along with other concert and live music programming from outside producers.

History 
In the winter of 2005, F. Stone Roberts (director and producer), Agent Ogden (editor and post supervisor), Colin Oberschmidt (director of photography), Sonia Taylor (production assistant), and George Oliphant (VJ) took residence in Vail, Colorado to launch the channel. The team produced live concerts and a one-hour weekly music show, called Uncompressed, from a lookalike ski lodge built inside the Eagle's Nest at the top of Vail Mountain. The channel's original executive producer was Morgan Hertzan, who had worked with mtvU. Olympic bump skier, pro football player, Jeremy Bloom was a guest VJ during the original run in Vail. Original concerts produced at Vail Resorts included James Blunt, Jamie Cullum, Yellowcard, Train, P.O.D, Hoobastank, Goo Goo Dolls, Gary Allan, The Fray, Death Cab For Cutie, and Mat Kearney.

The network officially launched on January 16, 2006 as Music: High Definition (MHD). At its debut, the channel had limited distribution with Verizon FiOS being the only provider to carry MHD. Two months later, Cox Communications reached an agreement to carry the channel, which was subsequently added to Cox systems in New Orleans, Tulsa, Oklahoma City, and Phoenix. Around the same time, Comcast started carrying the channel on its systems in Boston and Atlanta.

Charter Communications began carrying the channel on its St. Louis system on July 18, 2006, adding the channel to its systems in the northern Midwest in early November of that year. Time Warner Cable began carrying the channel in some regions in late December 2006. In 2007, Service Electric Cable Television began to carry the channel on its systems in northeastern and central Pennsylvania. On October 4, 2007, DirecTV began carrying the network nationwide.  The channel changed its name to Palladia on September 1, 2008. Initially, Mitsubishi Electric Digital Televisions was the exclusive sponsor.

In January 2015, Viacom Media Networks gave notice to subscription providers that they would rebrand Palladia as MTV Live on February 1, 2016, making it the fifth all-music channel Viacom has rebranded in the last year. Currently no other details outside of the rename notice, along with the addition of "best of" episodes of the PBS/KLRU music series Austin City Limits, have been revealed. Despite the rebranding, network officials made clear no change in focus towards any reality programming (as has been seen with MTV and VH1) is planned.

Programming 
Specials formerly broadcast on MTV Live included the HD simulcasts of the MTV Europe Music Awards, MTV Video Music Awards, CMT Music Awards and VH1 Hip Hop Honors. As carriage of the MTV, CMT and VH1 HD simulcast networks expanded, these programs became exclusive to their parent channel's HD broadcast streams.

The majority of the network's content consists of music video programming, which airs in the overnight, early morning, and daytime hours each day. Additionally, MTV Live airs a music video block on weeknights from 6 p.m. – 8 p.m. ET. Since May 11, 2019, MTV Live has expanded music video programming across each whole weekend.

In addition to the programs listed below, MTV Live frequently broadcasts concert footage and music documentaries.

List of programs broadcast by MTV Live

Current programming 
 Epic.Awesome.Videos (Music video programming)
 MTV Unplugged
 MTV World Stage (MTV Europe)
 Later... With Jools Holland
 Push Showcase (October 31, 2017–present)
 Rock Icons
 The Ride (MTV Europe)
 VH1 Storytellers (VH1)

Former programming 
 Best of Austin City Limits (PBS/KLRU)
 Classic Albums
 CMT Crossroads (CMT)
 Front and Center

 Life & Rhymes (BET Jams)
 Live from Daryl's House (September 6, 2012 – June 23, 2016)
 Live from the Artists Den
 MTV Jams (Hip hop and urban contemporary music video block)
 MTV Live Setlist (October 21, 2016 – June 17, 2017)
 nugs.net Live Stash (October 2, 2016 – November 20, 2016)
 Soulstage (BET Soul)
 Soundstage (PBS)
 That Metal Show, originally a VH1 Classic program, reruns of the show aired on the network.
 The Live Room
 TRL (May 21, 2018 – 2019)
 TRL Recap (October 31, 2017 – March 23, 2018)

References

External links 
 
 Vail Daily Article
 USA Today Article

MTV channels
Music video networks in the United States
English-language television stations in the United States